Jewels 11th Ring was a mixed martial arts (MMA) event held by MMA promotion Jewels.

The event hosted the Jewels Lightweight Queen tournament semi-finals and final along with the Rough Stone GP 2010 finals. It also held the retirement match of Miki Morifuji.

Background
For the first time at the Korakuen Hall, Jewels first announced the semi-finals the Jewels Lightweight Queen tournament and the finals of the Rough Stone GP 2010.

On , along with two other matches, it was announced that Hiroko Yamanaka was slated to fight against 2008 Olympic bronze medallist American Randi Miller. On , a reserve match for the Lightweight Queen tournament was announced, with Saori Ishioka and Yuko Oya as participants, along with a grappling bout added to the card.

Replacing Randi Miller, who withdrew from the event, on  it was announced that American Molly Helsel would take Miller's place and would face Hiroko Yamanaka, along with a second grappling match and a special exhibition match for the card.

Results

Opening card
1st opening fight: Jewels grappling rules -54 kg, 4:00 / 1R
 Emi Tomimatsu (Paraestra Matsudo) vs.  Akemi Ogawa (TK Esperanza)
Tomimatsu defeated Ogawa by decision (3-0).

2nd opening fight: Jewels grappling rules -54 kg, 4:00 / 1R
 Ricaco Yuasa (Pogona Club Gym) vs.  Mayumi Katouno (Iwaki K-3)
Yuasa defeated Katouno by decision (3-0).

Main card
1st match: Jewels official rules -55 kg bout, 5:00 / 2 R
 Emi Murata (AACC) vs.  Anna Saito (Fight Chix)
Murata defeated Saito by submission (triangle armbar) at 1:03 of round 1.

2nd match: Jewels official rules -50 kg bout, 5:00 / 2 R
 Miyoko Kusaka (Grabaka Gym) vs.  Asami Higa (S-Keep)
Kusaka defeated Higa by submission (scarf hold armlock) at 0:43 of round 2.

3rd match: Rough Stone GP 2010 –56 kg final, Jewels official rules, 5:00 / 2 R
 Asako Saioka (U-File Camp Gifu) vs.  Mizuki Inoue (White Heart Karate Association)
Inoue defeated Saioka by technical submission (referee stoppage, armbar) at 2:59 of round 1. Inoue became the Jewels -56kg Rough Stone Grand Prix 2010 champion.

4th match: Rough Stone GP 2010 –52 kg final, Jewels official rules, 5:00 / 2 R
 Hiroko Kitamura (Zendokai Koganei) vs.  Mai Ichii (Ice Ribbon)
Kitamura defeated Ichii by decision (3-0). Kitamura became the Jewels -52kg Rough Stone Grand Prix 2010 champion.

5th match: Rough Stone GP 2010 –48 kg final, Jewels official rules, 5:00 / 2 R
 Yukiko Seki (Fight Chix) vs.  Kikuyo Ishikawa (Reversal Gym Yokohama Ground Slam)
Ishikawa defeated Seki by decision (1-2). Ishikawa became the Jewels -52kg Rough Stone Grand Prix 2010 champion.

Special demonstration
Japanese Kyokushin Karate champion Yoko Bito and pro-wrestler Fuka presented a martial arts demonstration.

6th match: Jewels Lightweight Queen tournament semi-finals block A, Jewels official rules, 5:00 / 2 R
 Ayaka Hamasaki (AACC) vs.  Sakura Nomura (Club Barbarian Impact)
Hamasaki defeated Nomura by decision (3-0). Hamasaki advanced to the tournament final.

7th match: Jewels Lightweight Queen tournament semi-finals block B, Jewels official rules, 5:00 / 2 R
 Seo Hee Ham (CMA Korea Team Mad) vs.  Mika Nagano (Core)
Ham defeated Nagano by decision (2-1). Ham advanced to the tournament final.

8th match: Jewels Lightweight Queen tournament reserve match, Jewels official rules, 5:00 / 2 R
 Saori Ishioka (Zendokai Koganei) vs.  Yuko Oya (Deep Official Gym Impact)
Ishioka defeated Oya by submission (armbar) at 2:14 of round 1.

9th match: Miki Morifuji retirement match, special rules (pound allowed) -57 kg bout, 5:00 / 2 R
 Miki Morifuji (T-Blood) vs.  Kinuka Sasaki (Alive)
Morifuji defeated Sasaki by decision (3-0).

Special exhibition match, no time limit bout
 Rina Takeda (playing the role of character ) vs.  Kazutoshi Yokoyama (playing the role of character 
Promoting the Japanese film KG, actors were representing the roles of two characters from the movie.

10th match: Jewels official rules -59 kg bout, 5:00 / 2 R
 Shizuka Sugiyama (Zendokai Yokohama) vs.  Esui (Smash Alley Gym)
Esui defeated Sugiyama by TKO (corner stoppage, punches) at 0:13 of round 2.

11th match: Special rules (pound allowed) -65 kg bout, 5:00 / 2 R
 Hiroko Yamanaka (Master Japan) vs.  Molly Helsel (Victory MMA)
Yamanaka defeated Helsel by TKO (referee stoppage, 3 knockdowns, punches) at 3:11 of round 2.

12th match: Jewels Lightweight Queen tournament final, 5:00 / 2 R
 Ayaka Hamasaki (AACC) vs.  Seo Hee Ham (CMA Korea Team Mad)
Hamasaki defeated Ham by decision (3-0). Hamasaki became Jewels Lightweight Queen Champion.

Jewels Lightweight Queen tournament bracket

References

External links
Official results at Jewels official blog 
Event results at Sherdog
Event results  at Bout Review 
Event results (part 1 at God Bless the Ring 
Event results (part 2) at God Bless the Ring 
Event results at kakutoh.com 
Event results at sportsnavi.com 

Jewels (mixed martial arts) events
2010 in mixed martial arts
Mixed martial arts in Japan
Sports competitions in Tokyo
2010 in Japanese sport